The Roman Catholic Diocese of Argyll and the Isles (Latin ) is an ecclesiastical territory or diocese of the Catholic Church in Scotland, in the Province of Saint Andrews and Edinburgh.

Overview
The diocese covers an area of 31,080 km² and has a Catholic population of 10,546 (14.1%) out of a total population of 74,546 (2006 figures). The see is in the town of Oban where the seat is located at St Columba's Cathedral.

History
The diocese was erected on 5 March 1878 following the restoration of the Scottish Catholic hierarchy. On 28 December 2015 Pope Francis appointed Father Brian McGee to succeed the Right Reverend Joseph Toal as eleventh Bishop of Argyll and the Isles.

Timeline
After its establishment in 1878, the seat of the diocese was in various buildings each overlapping the same site:
 5 March 1878: The Scottish Catholic hierarchy is restored and the Diocese of Argyll and the Isles is erected. There was no cathedral, and the bishop resided in, what became, the Cathedral House. It was bought from the Society of Jesus who previously used it as a summer retreat house.
 Early 1880s: A wooden building served as the pro-cathedral for the diocese. It was located on the site of the Cathedral Hall.
 1886: A church made of corrugated iron became the pro-cathedral. It was known as the 'Tin Cathedral' and was given to the diocese by the Marquess of Bute.
 1919: Bishop Donald Martin decided to build a permanent cathedral.
 14 September 1932: The foundation stone of St Columba's Cathedral was laid.
 29 October 1933: The 'Tin Cathedral' was demolished to allow space for the cathedral to be finished. Worship continued in the Cathedral Hall.
 25 December 1934: The cathedral was opened.

Deaneries and Parishes
The diocese is organised into three deaneries each with several parishes:

 St Andrew’s Deanery
Dean: Fr Michael Hutson
 Parishes
 St Columba’s Cathedral, Oban
 The Visitation, Taynuilt
 St Andrew, Rothesay
 St Margaret, Lochgilphead
 St Mun, Dunoon
 St Kieran, Campbeltown
 Holy Cross, Brodick
 St Margaret’s Deanery
Dean:  Fr Roddy McAuley
 Parishes:
 St Mary, Arisaig
 St Margaret, Roybridge
 Our Lady of the Assumption, Portree
 Our Lady of the Angels, Mingarry
 St Mun, Ballachulish
 St Mary, Fort William
 St John’s, Caol
 Our Lady of the Rosary and St Columba, Kingussie
 St Mary & St Finnan, Glenfinnan
 Our Lady of Perpetual Succour & St Cumin, Morar
 St Michael’s Deanery
Dean: Fr Michael MacDonald
 Parishes:
 Our Holy Redeemer, Stornoway
 St Barr, Northbay
 St Michael, Eriskay
 St Peter, Daliburgh
 Our Lady, Star of the Sea, Castlebay
 St Mary, Bornish
 St Mary, Benbecula
 St Michael, Ardkenneth

Education
There are Catholic primary schools in Rothesay, Oban, Dunoon and Fort William.

Bishops

Past and present ordinaries

The following is a list of the Bishops of Argyll and the Isles:

 Angus MacDonald (appointed 22 March 1878 – translated to the Archdiocese of St Andrews and Edinburgh on 15 July 1892)
 George John Smith (appointed 31 December 1892 – died 18 January 1918)
 Donald Martin (appointed 2 April 1919 – died 6 December 1938)
 Donald Alphonsus Campbell (appointed 5 October 1939 – translated to the Archdiocese of Glasgow on 6 January 1945)
 Kenneth Grant (appointed 15 December 1945 – died 7 September 1959)
 Stephen McGill, P.S.S. (appointed 4 April 1960 – translated to the Diocese of Paisley 25 July 1968)
 Colin Aloysius MacPherson (appointed 2 December 1968 – died 24 March 1990)
 Roderick Wright (appointed 11 December 1990 – resigned 19 September 1996)
 (Keith O'Brien, appointed apostolic administrator June 1996 – resigned October 1999)
 Ian Murray (appointed 3 November 1999 – retired 16 October 2008)
 Joseph Anthony Toal (appointed 16 October 2008 - translated to Diocese of Motherwell 23 June 2014)
 sede vacante (23 June 2014 - 28 December 2015)
 Brian McGee  (appointed 28 December 2015)

Coadjutor Bishop
Ewen (Hugh) Cameron (1917), did not take effect

See also
 Catholic Church in Scotland

References

External links 
 
 Diocesan statistics
 
 GCatholic.org
 Catholic Hierarchy

Religion in Oban
Roman Catholic dioceses in Scotland
Religious organizations established in 1878
Roman Catholic dioceses and prelatures established in the 19th century
Roman Catholic Ecclesiastical Province of St Andrews and Edinburgh